In Treatment is an American drama television series for HBO, produced and developed by Rodrigo Garcia, based on the Israeli series BeTipul, created by Hagai Levi, Ori Sivan and Nir Bergman.

The series is about a psychotherapist, 50-something Paul Weston, and his weekly sessions with patients, as well as those with his own therapist at the end of the week. The program, which stars Gabriel Byrne as Paul, debuted on January 28, 2008, as a five-night-a-week series. Its executive producer and principal director was Paris Barclay, who directed 35 episodes, the most of any director on the series, and the only one to direct episodes in all three seasons. The program's format, script and opening theme are based on, and are often verbatim translations of BeTipul. HBO Canada aired the program simultaneously with HBO in the U.S. Season 1 earned numerous honors, including Emmy, Golden Globe and Writers Guild awards.

The series was renewed for a second season on June 20, 2008, and production on Season 2 wrapped in early 2009. According to The New York Times, production relocated to New York City from Los Angeles at the insistence of Byrne, who otherwise threatened to resign. The move and the addition of Sunday night to the schedule were considered votes of confidence in the series by HBO executives. Season 2 premiered on April 5, 2009. The second season built on the success of the first, winning a 2009 Peabody Award. The third season premiered on October 26, 2010, for a seven-week run, with four episodes per week. The 24-episode season premiered on May 23, 2021, and aired four episodes weekly.

In February 2022, HBO confirmed that the show would not return again.

Plot
Psychotherapist Paul Weston has a private practice where he carries out sessions with his patients in his Baltimore home. He begins to question his own abilities and motives, so he seeks help from his former mentor and therapist Gina Toll, whom he has not seen for ten years.

Characters

Paul Weston
Gabriel Byrne portrays Paul Weston, a charming, relentless psychologist, who is seeking a peaceful existence, free of self-doubt and ambivalence. He is a graduate of Georgetown University, where he earned his undergraduate degree, Columbia University, where he earned a master's degree, and The New School, where he received his PhD (though a season one scene shows two diplomas from the University of Pennsylvania displayed near the door to Paul's office). In summer 1988, he moved to Maryland, where he worked at the Washington–Baltimore Psychoanalytic Institute and later established his private practice in Baltimore.

Gina Toll
Dianne Wiest portrays psychotherapist Gina Toll, Paul's former mentor and clinical supervisor whom Paul avoided for nine years after an argument over reservations Gina expressed in a letter of recommendation on Paul's behalf. She acts as a sounding board for Paul's doubts about his motives and abilities.

Episodes

Each episode of In Treatment focuses on one patient, including Paul, who is seeing his clinical supervisor and psychotherapist, Gina.

Season 1

Therapy patient Laura professes her love for Paul, which causes their relationship to grow more complex and difficult to control. Laura's personal issues include being seduced by a much older man when she was a teenager. She begins an unsatisfying sexual relationship with Alex, another of Paul’s patients. Paul reflects on his own feelings for her and believes that he is in love with her; sessions with Gina fail to resolve his inner conflict over his desire and professional responsibility. Midway through the season, Laura ends her therapy with Paul after he continues to reject her advances. Paul and Laura encounter each other at Alex's funeral, and Paul decides to pursue Laura at the risk of destroying his marriage, but a panic attack prevents him from going through with it.

A fighter pilot who finds it impossible to express his internal struggles, Alex meets Laura and has a brief affair with her. Paul tries to get Alex to break through to his reasons for running himself to exhaustion and examine his feelings about killing Iraqi schoolchildren during a sanctioned mission. Alex drifts into instability, eventually deciding to end his therapy, and returns to the military just as Paul begins to make progress with Alex's repressed insecurities. Alex is killed during a training exercise, and although his death is ruled an accident, some indications suggest that Alex's death was a suicidal reaction caused by the trauma of therapeutic reflection.

Sophie's ambivalence about life is elicited and broken down by Paul, who examines her underage sexual relationship with her much older gymnastics coach, Cy, and its effects on her, in addition to her conflicted feelings about her divorced parents and her father's distance from her. Eventually, Sophie benefits greatly from the therapy and begins to repair her relationship with her parents. At the end of the season, Sophie leaves Baltimore to pursue further gymnastic training in Denver.

Jake and Amy's debate about whether she should have an abortion is the prologue to what is revealed to be an extremely volatile, dysfunctional relationship. During their second session, Amy has a miscarriage, but the couple return  to therapy to work on their issues. Amy's inability to hold emotional connection leads her to have an affair with her boss, a man she finds "gross" but uses as a buffer against Jake. Jake and Amy each have an individual session, and finally and sadly decide to end their marriage and share custody of their son. Jake believes the therapy was helpful, but Amy thinks it hurt their marriage.

Throughout the season, Gina and Paul confront each other over issues in their shared history and opposing views, but by the finale Paul realizes he needs her input and agrees to continue therapy.

The first season consists of 43 episodes, with each episode airing on its allotted day of the week, Monday to Friday. The episodes were spread over nine weeks for most of the characters, except in the final week, which did not have Monday or Tuesday installments.

Season 2
Paul, now divorced and quite lonely, has moved to Brooklyn, and uses the living room of his small refurbished walk-up brownstone for patient visits. Alex's father, Alex Sr., serves him with a malpractice lawsuit in the first episode, and he becomes preoccupied with it.

Alex Sr. sues Paul for negligence, charging him with failing to prevent the death of his son, who voluntarily discontinued therapy and was killed in a plane crash that was either an accident or suicide. Alex Sr. and his lawyers contend that Paul's professional responsibility was to contact the military and report Alex Jr. unfit for duty. Alex Sr. later meets with Paul and makes a loaded offer: if Paul writes a letter taking blame for Alex Jr.'s death, he will drop the lawsuit, satisfied to have his belief that Paul is 100% at fault confirmed. Paul considers the offer but later concurs with Gina's advice and rejects it. The lawsuit is dismissed as frivolous, and Paul's angst about his professional competence is at least temporarily alleviated.

The season had seven episodes for each character. The Monday and Tuesday sessions aired back-to-back on Sundays, while the remaining three ran on Mondays. HBO repeated the episodes in sequence, several times each week. The season's executive producer was Warren Leight, who previously worked on Law and Order: Criminal Intent.

Season 3
After the final episode of the second season, Leight said in an interview that a third season remained possible, but that the show had been exhausting for everyone involved and also something less than a "breakout hit" for HBO. On October 23, 2009, HBO announced that it had picked up In Treatment for a third season. Production began in early 2010 for a premiere in late October.

The third season is the first not based on the original Israeli series Be'Tipul, which had only two. The format is similar: each week, a series of patients visit Paul in half-hour episodes, while in the last, Paul visits his own therapist, Adele Brouse.

There are only three patients this season. Paul still lives in Cobble Hill, Brooklyn and has a young girlfriend, Wendy.

On Mondays, Paul sees Sunil, a widower transported to New York from Calcutta after his wife's death to live with his son, his son's wife, and their two young children.

Tuesday's patient is Frances, a self-described successful actress who has returned to the stage but has difficulty remembering her lines. She is also coping with a dying sister, a broken marriage and a scornful teenage daughter.

On Wednesdays, Paul sees Jesse, a high school student who believes his adopted parents hate him because he is gay.

Paul eventually reenters therapy with the young psychoanalyst Adele Brouse, initially seeking a prescription for sleep medication. Adele perceives that lack of sleep is not his real problem.

The show remains set in Paul's apartment. Unlike the first two seasons, the third season has only four episodes per week. The show aired on Mondays and Tuesdays and, like season 2, had seven weeks of sessions.

On March 30, 2011, HBO said In Treatment would not continue in its existing form but might continue in a different format.

Season 4
In July 2020, it was reported that HBO was developing a reboot of the series. In October 2020, HBO confirmed the revival and production began in late 2020. The 24-episode season premiered on May 23, 2021, on HBO and HBO Max. Jennifer Schuur and Joshua Allen are the fourth season's co-showrunners.

Main cast
 Uzo Aduba as Dr. Brooke Taylor, a therapist
 Anthony Ramos as Eladio Restrepo, Brooke's patient who works as a home health aide for a wealthy family
 John Benjamin Hickey as Colin, Brooke's patient who is a white-collar criminal recently released from prison
 Quintessa Swindell as Laila, Brooke's patient who is a rebellious teenager
 Charlayne Woodard as Rhonda, Laila's grandmother
 Liza Colón-Zayas as Rita, Brooke's AA sponsor

Recurring cast
 Joel Kinnaman as Adam, Brooke's longtime on-again, off-again boyfriend

Critical response
The series was generally well-received, attaining positive reviews. On the review aggregator website Metacritic, the first season scored 70/100, the second 85/100, the third 83/100, and the fourth 73/100.

On Rotten Tomatoes, the first season has a 78% approval rating with an average score of 6.1/10 based on 36 reviews; the critical consensus reads, "In Treatment has finely-written scripts that develop with raw emotion while unspooling engrossing suspense." The second season has a 100% approval rating with an average score of 8.9/10 based on 19 reviews; the critical consensus reads, "In Treatment continues to hone in on its characters in the second season, allowing the cast to find more nuances in their performances." The third season has an 87% approval rating with an average score of 8.6/10 based on 23 reviews; the critical consensus reads, "In Treatment offers some of the tightest dramatic writing and purest performances on television." The fourth season has a 96% approval rating with an average score of 7.5/10 based on 24 reviews; the critical consensus reads, "In Treatment returns with a solid fourth season that captures the spirit of the original while giving its new ensemble—led by an outstanding Uzo Aduba—plenty of room to shine.

The Los Angeles Timess Mary McNamara called In Treatment "cleverly conceived," well-written and -acted, but "stagey" and "strain[ing]... believability". Varietys Brian Lowry deemed it "more interesting structurally than in its execution". On Slate, Troy Patterson found it tiresome for its "nattering" and "ambitious hogwash". In Entertainment Weekly, Ken Tucker gave it a "B+", with "lots of great soapy intrigue". The New York Times wrote, "In Treatment [...] is hypnotic, mostly because it withholds information as intelligently as it reveals it. [...] The half-hour episodes are addictive, and few viewers are likely to be satisfied with just one session at a time. [...] In Treatment provides an irresistible peek at the psychopathology of everyday life—on someone else's tab."

Awards and nominations

60th Primetime Emmy Awards:
Won – Outstanding Supporting Actress in a Drama Series (Dianne Wiest)
Won – Outstanding Guest Actor in a Drama Series (Glynn Turman)
Nominated – Outstanding Lead Actor in a Drama Series (Gabriel Byrne)
Nominated – Outstanding Cinematography for a Half-Hour Series (Fred Murphy): Week 6: Sophie
61st Primetime Emmy Awards:
Nominated – Outstanding Lead Actor in a Drama Series (Gabriel Byrne)
Nominated – Outstanding Supporting Actress in a Drama Series (Hope Davis)
Nominated – Outstanding Supporting Actress in a Drama Series (Dianne Wiest)
73rd Primetime Emmy Awards:
Nominated – Outstanding Lead Actress in a Drama Series (Uzo Aduba – Episode: "Week 5: Brooke")
66th Golden Globe Awards:
Won – Best Lead Actor in a Drama Series (Gabriel Byrne)
Nominated – Best Television Series - Drama
Nominated – Best Supporting Actress in a Series, Miniseries, or TV Film (Dianne Wiest)
Nominated – Best Supporting Actress in a Series, Miniseries, or TV Film (Melissa George)
Nominated – Best Supporting Actor in a Series, Miniseries, or TV Film (Blair Underwood)
Satellite Awards 2008:
Nominated – Best Drama Series
Nominated – Best Actor in a Drama Series (Gabriel Byrne)
Nominated – Best Supporting Actress in a Series, Miniseries, or TV Film (Dianne Wiest)
Satellite Awards 2009:
Nominated – Best Drama Series
Nominated – Best Actor in a Drama Series (Gabriel Byrne)
Directors Guild of America Awards 2008:
Nominated – Outstanding Directorial Achievement in Dramatic Series (Paris Barclay - Episode: "Week 8: Alex")
Directors Guild of America Awards 2009:
Nominated – Outstanding Directorial Achievement in Dramatic Series (Paris Barclay - Episode: "Week 4: Gina")
Writers Guild of America Awards 2008:
Won – New Series (Rodrigo García, Bryan Goluboff, Davey Holmes, William Meritt Johnson, Amy Lippman, and Sarah Treem)
2008 AFI Awards:
Top 10 Best Television Programs of 2008
2009 Peabody Award

References

External links

2000s American drama television series
2008 American television series debuts
2010s American drama television series
2010 American television series endings
2020s American drama television series
2021 American television series debuts
2021 American television series endings
American television series based on Israeli television series
American television series revived after cancellation
English-language television shows
HBO original programming
Peabody Award-winning television programs
Primetime Emmy Award-winning television series
Serial drama television series
Television shows set in New York City
Television shows set in Baltimore
Works about psychoanalysis
Psychotherapy in fiction